Zuo Liangyu (1599–1645) was a Ming dynasty and Southern Ming general. He was born in Linqing, Shandong Province.

Campaign against Zhang Xianzhong
After defeating peasant rebels at She County, Hebei, Huixian and Wu'an and eliminating their presence in Shanxi and Henan provinces, Zuo went the forces of Zhang Xianzhong who were threatening Xiangyang in Hubei province (then part of Huguang). After setting up camp at Yunyang District and Fang County, Zuo's army fell into an ambush at Gucheng County, Hubei. 10,000 Ming soldiers were killed and only a few thousand escaped alive. During this campaign, soldiers consumed peach and jujube due to a shortage of grain. Zhang eventually led his followers to Sichuan province.

Campaign against Li Zicheng
Zuo, meanwhile, was forced to head back to Henan to confront the followers of the rebel leader Li Zicheng. Unsuccessful in his request for reinforcements to the Prince of Chu in Wuchang, Zuo and general Sun Chuanting engaged Li's forces at Zhuxian. Their defeat enabled Li to capture the city of Kaifeng.

Service under Southern Ming
After the fall of Beijing to Li Zicheng and the death of the Chongzhen Emperor, Zuo declared his loyalty to the Hongguang Emperor of Southern Ming. On May 13, 1645, his forces surrendered to the Manchu general Ajige at Taiping Prefecture, Anhui Province. Zuo refused to serve the Manchus and was later executed.

References

 《小腆纪年附考》上册，175页
 侯方域壮悔堂集》《宁南侯传》中说：“良玉乃兴兵清君侧，欲废弘光帝，立楚世子。”
 李清《南渡录》卷五记，新升广西总兵黄斌卿于九江附近连败左军，“获其奏檄、书牍甚众，内贻礼部尚书钱谦益一牍，有废置语。斌卿初欲奏闻，恐为诸人祸，乃止”。
 《明季南略》卷三载《左良玉参马士英八罪疏》、《左良玉讨马士英檄》、《又檄》三文
 吴晋锡《半生自记》
 《国榷》载于四月初五日，《南渡录》卷五与《明季南略》卷二载于初四日
 袁继咸《浔阳纪事》
 谈迁记：“左良玉兵至九江。袁继咸过见于舟中，俄见岸上火起，报曰：‘袁兵烧营，自破其城。’良玉浩叹曰：‘此我兵耳，我负袁临侯也。’呕血数升，病遂革。”（《国榷》卷一百二）
 袁继咸《六柳堂遗集》余卷，附《家僮禀帖》云：“左宁南要护先帝太子，与黄澍爷带兵马下南京，进城（指九江）挟请老爷（指袁继咸）同行。不料月初四日左宁南老爷大疾死于舟中，其子总爷左梦庚假称左老爷卧病在床，代替管事。”
 

1599 births
1645 deaths
Ming dynasty generals
People from Linqing
Southern Ming people